Sanjay Arora is an Indian police officer who is serving as Police Commissioner of Delhi and served as Chief of Indo-Tibetan Border Police. He also served as Commissioner of Police for Coimbatore and Commander of Indo-Tibetan Border Police in Uttarkashi district.

Personal life 
He was batch officer of Tamil Nadu Civil Service during 1988. He got bachelor degree in Electrical engineering from Malaviya National Institute of Technology, Jaipur.

Awards 

 Chief Minister Gallantry Medal for Bravery and Heroic Action for doing action against gang of Veerappan.
 President's Police Medal for Distinguished Service in 2014

References 

Commissioners of Delhi Police
Indian police officers
Chiefs of Indo-Tibetan Border Police
Year of birth missing (living people)
Living people